The 1955 Montana Grizzlies football team represented the University of Montana in the 1955 college football season as a member of the Skyline Conference. The Grizzlies were led by first-year head coach Jerry Williams, played their home games at Dornblaser Field and finished the season with a record of three wins and seven losses (3–7, 2–4 MSC).

Schedule

References

Montana
Montana Grizzlies football seasons
Montana Grizzlies football